Bandhwa is a small village in the Bhojpur district of India. Bandhwa is located in Tarari block of Bhojpur district in Bihar. It has total 431 families residing. Bandhawan has population of 2,340 as per government records.

Administration
Bandhwa village is administrated by Mukhiya through its Gram Panchayat, who is elected representative of village as per constitution of India and Panchyati Raj Act. The mukhiya of the respective panchayat is "JAI PRAKASH SINGH",As per the report of Pankaj kumar, native of same village.

Economy
Bandhwa was the center of sugarcane farming in the era of British India, but nowadays the major sources of income are paddy, wheat, maize and onion.
Boundary****
In the east of this village a small river named "KHAUR" flows. In west side of this village, there is a magnificent pond where the famous festival "CHHATH" is organised every year. In the north side, there is huge land for paddy fertilization and the people use to call this land "ZIRAAT". And in the south side, there is a huge sun temple about to be constructed.

Nereby places
 Buxar
 Arrah
 Dumraon
 Patna
 Piro
 Bikramganj
 Hasanbazar

References

External links
Villages in Bhojpur, Bihar 

Villages in Bhojpur district, India